Haverford Senior High School is the public high school of Haverford Township, Pennsylvania, United States, operated by the School District of Haverford Township. It is at 200 Mill Road in Havertown.
The school serves the entirety of Haverford Township, including all of the unincorporated community of "Havertown" (a place name created by the US Postal Service to designate ZIP Code 19083, which is wholly within Haverford Township), and the Haverford Township portions of the unincorporated communities of Haverford, Bryn Mawr, Ardmore, Drexel Hill, and Wynnewood.

Approximately 90% of Haverford's graduates continue their formal education at colleges, universities and technical schools. Haverford students traditionally are well-placed in the National Merit Scholar Program and other academic award competitions in mathematics, science, foreign languages, writing, art and music.

There are five elementary schools in the School District of Haverford Township: Chatham Park Elementary, Coopertown Elementary, Chestnutwold Elementary, Lynnewood Elementary, and Manoa Elementary. These elementary schools feed into the middle school, which then feeds into Haverford High School.

Haverford High operates WHHS, the first FM broadcast high school radio station in the United States. The school also has an award-winning newspaper that is almost over 80 years old, The Fordian.

History
The first recorded purchase of land for educational purposes in Haverford Township was made on October 28, 1797. A stone structure erected on a site along Darby Road at the crossroads Coopertown served as a school until 1872. Today, known as the Federal School, the building still stands and serves as a window to history for Haverford Township children. Every fourth-grade student spends a day at the Federal School learning what it was like to be a student in 1797.

The Llanerch School was built in 1905 and still stands on Darby road. It served as the high school until 1910. The Oakmont School was built on Eagle Road at Hathaway Lane in 1912 to serve as the new high school. It remained the high school until 1923. With the dawn of a new decade and World War I in the past, Haverford Township began experiencing another wave of expansion. In 1923, the "new" Haverford High School on Darby Road was completed. It was expanded to include a junior high school in the 1930s and now serves as the Haverford Middle School; it previously housed the school district's administrative offices.

In 1956, the new (and current) Haverford High School was constructed on Mill Road, creating a complex of fields and buildings used by both the high school and the adjacent Haverford Middle School.

The high school building was expanded and modernized from 1996 to 1999. Renovations took a long time and created many issues, one being that one side of the school is higher than the other. The most significant physical addition to the school during these years was the demolition of a small building at the rear center of the (used as counselling suite and lounge area) and the construction of a three-floor addition to house new and spacious science classrooms/laboratories, as well as large seminar classrooms. With this change, rear classrooms in the center of the original building lost exterior windows, and now looked out over open common space adjacent to two new cafeterias, separated by a large new kitchen. Further, this new addition included new administrative offices. This meant that these offices left their original locations along the front of the center wing of the original building. This space became a new principal's office, infirmary, and sewing classroom. A new staircase was added. With the construction of the additions, the wood, metal, and motor shops were eliminated from the building, along with those courses. Wood shop continued to be offered at the Haverford Middle School facility.

Also during the 1996–1999 renovations, the original cafeteria was renovated into a new art classroom wing, as well as a large college-style seminar classroom. With the moving of the art rooms, the former art space became the current choir classroom. The former choir classroom became a new weight room for the school's athletes. The original library space was turned into classroom space for child development and cooking classes. A faculty lunchroom from that part of the building was removed.

Additionally, renovations involved removing the entire interior of areas being renovated, such that today's classrooms are not merely redone versions of the original rooms, but rather, entirely new rooms. One long-debated result of this renovation was that in removing the interior and building it anew, walls of concrete brick and glazed tiling were removed, and replaced uniformly with drywall. As a result, the walls are easily damaged and frequently require patching or painting. Many windows were covered or eliminated in the renovation. The exterior of the building today reveals that along the upper section of the gymnasium, stuccoed panels cover what had been large windows. Most classrooms lost half their window area as glass bricks were covered over, leaving only the lower, operable parts of the windows exposed. The rear wall of the interior of the auditorium also once was lined with windows covered with drapes; renovations replaced the windows with walls. The only area of the school that appears nearly as it did when the building first opened is the auditorium and gymnasium lobby, which still combine terrazzo flooring, chrome, blond varnished wood, and glazed bricks, giving this area the character the entire building once had.

A large, bright library with a large mezzanine with desktop computers was added. The school was also fully air-conditioned in the renovation.

Haverford Hi-Q
Hi-Q is an interdisciplinary and interscholastic quiz competition among 21 schools in Delaware County and schools in three other states: Washington, Alabama, and Wisconsin. Haverford High School has won Delco Hi-Q 12 times since 1963 and the National Championship three times (2017, 2018, and 2022).

Sports

The Haverford High School sports teams are called the "Fords," and they have a Model T Ford as their mascot. A book about the athletic history of the school (1914 to 2014) was written by Art Sciubba.

Football 

The Haverford High School football team has one of the longest running gridiron rivalries in Pennsylvania, facing off against Upper Darby High School since 1921.

The game is played on Thanksgiving Day and alternates between the two schools' football stadiums.

Notable NFL players from Haverford High School include four-time Super Bowl champion Randy Grossman of the Pittsburgh Steelers, former Washington Redskin Sam Venuto and 1974 Maxwell Award winner Steve Joachim of the Baltimore Colts.

Upper Darby vs. Haverford all-time results

(Haverford leads the series 50–43–6.)

*NOTE: Haverford and Upper Darby played twice in 1943. Upper Darby won the first game, 18–0.
|-
The annual game did not take place on Thanksgiving day in 2020 due to the COVID-19 pandemic. However, it was still played to keep the tradition. Haverford won this game 40-0.

Basketball 

The Haverford High men's basketball team won its only PIAA State Championship in 1958, defeating Altoona 67–45 at the Palestra in Philadelphia. Haverford High were PIAA runners-up in 1970, losing to Beaver Falls 82–58 at the Farm Show Arena in Harrisburg.

Volleyball 

The Haverford High School men's volleyball team, under coach Ted Keyser, won 17 district titles and 9 Pennsylvania state championships.

Ice hockey 

In 1969, the Haverford High School ice hockey team was one of the seven original members of the Inter-County Scholastic Hockey League, the first high schools to participate in Pennsylvania high school hockey. The team's original coach, Ed Galli, was also the president of the league.

Flyers Cup Championships

* Class A State Champions

Cheerleading 
PIAA State champions of 2016, 2017

Field hockey

WHHS 

WHHS is the student-run high school radio station of Haverford Senior High School. It is the oldest high school radio station in the country. The station itself is located within the school, and the transmitter is located nearby, covering a 5 to 10-mile radius. WHHS originally occupied 89.3 FM until 1992, when the FCC forced it to change frequencies, and then 107.9 FM, until a new, major radio station based in Philadelphia (WRNB) forced WHHS to change frequencies again. WHHS currently occupies 99.9 FM under a special exemption from the FCC while the station undergoes the formal process of applying for a station license.

Typical show formats include rock, classic rock, rap/hip-hop, sports talk, political talk, and sometimes more eclectic genres like classical or jazz. Occasionally, shows feature live performances from local or school-based bands.

Students apply for a radio show (usually 90 minutes long), and a typical show has two to four hosts. On the basis of interviews and previous experience with the station, students are chosen to fill several positions, including Station Director, Director of Music, and Director of News. The radio station provides an introduction into the radio or communications industries for students interested in careers in these fields.

In 2006, the station began broadcasting live sporting events such as football and hockey, even broadcasting live from the Wachovia Spectrum, the former home of the Philadelphia Flyers and 76ers. The station is continuing to branch out into the community with the effort spearheaded by producing a product that township residents can understand and enjoy while teaching students necessary skills and encouraging creativity. This has been accomplished in many ways, including a 12-hour election day special with interviews before the elections with such politicians and Congressman Curt Weldon and Congressman-elect Joe Sestak.

Alumni
Craig Bickhardt, country singer/songwriter and guitarist; Class of 1972
Garrett Brown, inventor of the steadicam
Shayne Culpepper, two-time Olympian in track and field, in 2004 in the 5,000m and in 2000 in the 1,500m; Class of 1992
 Emily deRiel, 2000 Summer Olympics silver medalist in modern pentathlon; Class of 1992
 Mark DiFelice, Major League Baseball pitcher for the Milwaukee Brewers organization; Class of 1994
 Jimmy Dykes, third and second baseman for the Philadelphia Athletics and Chicago White Sox; Manager of the Chicago White Sox, Philadelphia Athletics, Baltimore Orioles, Cincinnati Reds, Detroit Tigers, and Cleveland Indians
 Rick Fisher, two-time Tony Award winner for lighting design; Class of 1972
 Alex G, singer-songwriter; Class of 2011
 Samantha Gongol, musician, part of the duo Marian Hill; Class of 2008
 Randy Grossman, former tight end for the Pittsburgh Steelers in the National Football League; four-time Super Bowl Champion; Class of 1970
 Brendan Hansen, 2004, 2008, 2012 Summer Olympic Games breaststroke swimmer
 William Hoeveler, lawyer and judge
Steve Joachim, former professional football player for the New York Jets; won the Maxwell Award in 1974
George R. Johnson, Pennsylvania State Representative for the 166th district (1967-1972)
Ross Katz, Academy Award-nominated film producer
Joe Lunardi, ESPN's March Madness Bracketologist
Buddy Marucci, 2008 United States Senior Men's Amateur Golf Champion, US Walker Cup Captain 2007 and 2009, 1995 U.S. Amateur runner-up
 Clay Myers, photographer, animal welfare advocate; Class of 1976
 Mitchel Resnick, MIT professor; creator of programmable bricks, the forerunner of LEGO Mindstorms, and Scratch software; co-founder of Computer Clubhouse
 Pia Reyes, November 1988 Playboy centerfold
 David Ricketts, singer, musician, songwriter, producer for A&M Records; Class of 1972
 Louis Robertshaw, lieutenant general in the United States Marine Corps
 Shane Ryan, 2016 Olympic swimmer; class of 2012
 Michael Sembello, guitarist, singer/songwriter; Class of 1972
 Jean Shiley, 1932 Olympic gold medal winner
 Andy Talley, head coach of Villanova University Football
 Judy Toll, comedian, writer, and actress
 Michael Tollin, director and producer
 Jennifer Toof, appeared on VH1's Flavor of Love 2, Flavor of Love Girls: Charm School, and I Love Money
 Sam Venuto, former running back in the NFL
Tom Verica, actor and director; Class of 1982
Charles Alan Wright (1927-2000), constitutional lawyer widely considered to have been the foremost authority in the US on constitutional law and federal procedure; law professor, University of Texas School of Law (1955-2000), University of Minnesota Law School (1950-1955); Class of 1944
 Mark G. Yudof, President, University of California (June 2008–present); former chancellor, University of Texas system (August 2002 to May 2008); former president, University of Minnesota (1997 to 2002); Class of 1962

References

External links

 Haverford High School website

Public high schools in Pennsylvania
Educational institutions established in 1926
Haverford Township, Pennsylvania
School buildings completed in 1956
Schools in Delaware County, Pennsylvania
1926 establishments in Pennsylvania